This is a list of World War II-era fortifications on the British Columbia Coast.

North Coast
Barrett Point 
Frederick Point, Digby Island, twin QF 12 pounder naval guns 
Casey Point, 2x25 pounders 
Fairview Point, 2x 8" railway guns 
Dundas Point 
Seal Cove 
Watson Island, ammunition depot, hospital, ocean dock (stores warehouse), and command post

Central Coast
Bella Bella - Two 75mm guns and an anti-aircraft to protect the seaplane base 
Yorke Island coastal defence fort

South Coast
Fort Rodd Hill, originally built in the 19th century to defend Victoria and CFB Esquimalt 
Albert Head, 9.2 inch guns, counter bombardment battery during WWII  
Mary Hill 
Christopher Point Battery - 1941-44 -2 x 8 inch M1888 american railway guns
Duntze Head 
Ogden Point Battery - 1939-1943 with better guns replaced Breakwater Battery in 1944
Black Rock battery - 1893-1956  
Macaulay Point, 3 gun battery dating back to 1878 
Golf Hill (WW II 1940-44 position), 2 x 12 pdr quick-firing Anti Motor Torpedo Boat (AMTB) guns
Point Grey, 3 6" guns and Director tower, now the site of the Museum of Anthropology at UBC, although one gun position and tunnel entrances remain. 
Ferguson Point, Stanley Park 
First Narrows Gantry, two 12pdr QF guns. Demolished in the 70's 
Steveston, one 18pdr field gun, later replaced by two 25pdr field guns Ordnance QF 25 pounder 
 Signal Hill (Needs Restoration)

References

World War II sites in Canada
Coast of British Columbia